Thomas "Big Train" Parker, Jr. (February 12, 1912 – October 14, 1964) was an American baseball pitcher in the Negro leagues.

Career
He played from 1931 to 1948 with several teams, playing mostly with the Homestead Grays. After serving in the U.S. Army during World War II, Parker briefly returned to professional baseball, but returned home to Louisiana.

Death
Parker died in 1964 and is buried in Plot E, Grave 3664 in the Alexandria National Cemetery in Pineville, Louisiana.

References

External links
 and Seamheads

1912 births
1964 deaths
Indianapolis ABCs (1931–1933) players
Harrisburg Stars players
Homestead Grays players
Indianapolis Athletics players
New York Black Yankees players
New York Cubans players
Birmingham Black Barons players
Elmwood Giants players
New Orleans Crescent Stars players
20th-century African-American sportspeople
Baseball pitchers